Trioceros johnstoni, known commonly as Johnston's chameleon, Johnston's three-horned chameleon, or the Ruwenzori three-horned chameleon, is an endemic chameleon of the Albertine Rift in Central Africa.

Taxonomy
Trioceros johnstoni is a species in the lizard family Chamaeleonidae.
The specific name johnstoni was given in honor of the British explorer Harry Johnston.

Distribution and habitat

Behaviour and ecology
T. johnstoni is oviparous.

References

Further reading
Spawls, Stephen; Howell, Kim; Hinkel, Harald; Menegon, Michele (2018). Field Guide to East African Reptiles, 2nd Edition. London: Bloomsbury Natural History. 624 pp. .

External links

 Trioceros johnstoni. Reptile Database

Trioceros
Lizards of Africa
Reptiles described in 1901
Taxa named by George Albert Boulenger